Below is a list of the 30 largest incorporated cities in the State of Iowa ranked by population, based on the 2020 United States Census. These are the actual incorporated areas of the listed cities, as opposed to metropolitan areas, or counties, and will therefore differ from other available population listings.

List

See also

 Iowa census statistical areas
 List of Iowa counties
 List of cities in Iowa
 List of unincorporated communities in Iowa
 List of townships in Iowa

References

Iowa (by population)
Iowa
Cities by population
Cities (Iowa)